The 1920 United States presidential election in Missouri took place on November 2, 1920, as a part of the 1920 United States presidential election. Voters chose 18 representatives, or electors, to the Electoral College, who voted for president and vice president.

The Republican candidate, Warren G. Harding, won the state of Missouri and collected its 18 electoral votes.

Results

Results by county

See also
 United States presidential elections in Missouri

References

Missouri
1920 Missouri elections
United States presidential elections in Missouri